Nkechi Justina Nwaogu,  is a Nigerian politician and banker, founder and CEO Libra Investment. She is the former Chairman Governing Council and Pro Chancellor University of Calabar. Nwaogu was the Member representing Osisioma Ngwa, Ugwunagbo and Obi Ngwa Federal Constituency in the Federal House of Representatives from 2003 to 2007. In 2007 she was elected as the Senator representing Abia Central Senatorial District. In 2011 she was re-elected for a second tenure in office.

In 2016, Nwaogu officially declared her membership of the ruling party the All Progressives Congress (APC).

Background
Nkechi Nwaogu is a two time Senator and the immediate past pro Chancellor University of Calabar. An astute financial technocrat. Senator Nkechi Justina Nwaogu is married to Dr Roland Nwaogu of blessed memory

Educational, Political and professional career
.

Senator Nkechi Nwaogu  equipped herself with the right education both at home and abroad. She had her First School Leaving Certificate in 1967 at Aba Township School and later attended Immaculate Heart Secondary School in 1975. Preparing herself for greater responsibilities, she left Nigeria for London where she obtained a Diploma in Printing Management from the London College of Printing, London. By 1981, she got her Post Graduate Degree in Management Studies (Major in Finance) from the Polytechnic of South Bank London, now University of South London. Still eager for more knowledge, this amiable lawmaker proceeded to the Brunel University in Oxbridge Middlesex England where she bagged an M.sc in Management (Major in Finance) in 1984. She is presently pursuing a Doctorate Degree in Policy Analysis and Financial Management. In 2018, she bagged her Doctorate degree in Political science from the University of Nigeria Nsukka

In her first tenure in the upper legislative chamber, she was the Chairperson Senate Committee on Banking, Insurance and other Financial Institutions. She was able to restore adherence to rules and order in the nation's financial sector.

In her  position as the chairman, Senate Committee on Gas Resources, she has pushed for greater transparency, accountability and rapid development in the nation's gas industry.

She has been a member of the ECOWAS Parliament from 2005 to date and was also the Executive Director for West African Region, African Parliamentarian's Network Against Corruption, APNAC.

She made her first mark in the corporate financial world in England from 1979 to 1987. In 1987 Nwaogu relocated to Nigeria to complete the one year compulsory National Youth Service Corp. She was immediately engaged by the International Merchant Bank Plc as Credit Analyst. Thereafter she joined Commerce Bank Ltd as Deputy Manager and later Diamond bank as Branch Manager. Due to her interest in making credit available to the rural active poor, she established an Investment Company - Libra Investments Ltd, which had a track record of providing credits to many rural traders and artisans for the development of their various businesses.

In December 2011 Nwaogu's April election was overturned by a Nigerian Court of Appeals.

Pro Chancellor University of Calabar
Nwaogu was appointed the Pro Chancellor and Chairman Governing Board, University of Calabar. Her achievements in her tenure included the election of the first female Vice Chancellor, Professor Florence Obi.

Awards and recognitions 

Commander of the order of the Niger, CON by Former President Goodluck Ebele Jonathan

Ugo Nwanyi Ndigbo by Eze Nri.

Outstanding Leadership Award by the International Inner Wheel, Nigeria

Award of Excellence in Community Service by Rotary Club of Aba https://abiastate.gov.ng/senator-nkechi-nwaogu/

Award of Recognition by Igbo Women Union

Ngwa Ambassador by Ngwa Women Cultural Association, Lagos

A special recognition by Ngwa women of Los Angeles, California, USA

References

External links

 Interview, "My late husband drafted me into politics", Nigerian Sun, 2018
 Interview, "The ugly reasons I said bye to PDP", Vanguard, 2015

Igbo politicians
Women members of the Senate (Nigeria)
1956 births
Living people
Peoples Democratic Party members of the Senate (Nigeria)
People from Abia State
21st-century Nigerian politicians
21st-century Nigerian women politicians